Macaca anderssoni is a prehistoric species of macaque from the Pleistocene of China. This species has a unique nasal cavity morphology that is laterally expanded anteriorly and constricted posteriorly. This morphology is not found in other macaque species, except for some of the larger members of the Sinica group.

References

M
Prehistoric monkeys
Pleistocene mammals of Asia
Pleistocene primates
Cenozoic Japan
Extinct animals of Japan
Fossil taxa described in 1924
Fossils of China
Fossils of Japan